Keith Peache (born 10 August 1947) is a male retired British wrestler.

Wrestling career
Peache competed at the 1976 Summer Olympics and the 1980 Summer Olympics. He represented England finishing in fourth place in the 100kg heavyweight division, at the 1978 Commonwealth Games in Edmonton, Alberta, Canada. Four years later he once again finished just outside the medals when finishing fourth again for England, at the 1982 Commonwealth Games in Brisbane, Queensland, Australia. He finally won a medal (a bronze) in the +100kg super-heavyweight division at the 1986 Commonwealth Games in Edinburgh, Scotland.

References

1947 births
Living people
British male sport wrestlers
Olympic wrestlers of Great Britain
Wrestlers at the 1976 Summer Olympics
Wrestlers at the 1980 Summer Olympics
People from Lewisham
Sportspeople from London
Wrestlers at the 1978 Commonwealth Games
Wrestlers at the 1982 Commonwealth Games
Wrestlers at the 1986 Commonwealth Games
Commonwealth Games bronze medallists for England
Commonwealth Games medallists in wrestling
Medallists at the 1986 Commonwealth Games